Guðmundur Þorbjörnsson (born 19 April 1957) is a retired Icelandic footballer and coach. He played most of his career in Valur and also coached the team in 1989. He made 37 caps for Iceland and scored seven goals.

References

External links
 

1957 births
Living people
Place of birth missing (living people)
Guthmundur Thorbjornsson
Guthmundur Thorbjornsson
Guthmundur Thorbjornsson
FC Baden players
Association football forwards
Valur (men's football) managers
Icelandic football managers
Icelandic expatriate footballers
Expatriate footballers in Switzerland
Icelandic expatriate sportspeople in Switzerland